Jacaraípe is a district of Serra, a municipality of the Brazilian state of Espírito Santo. Considered part of the greater Vitória Region, it is now a suburb of Vitória, the state capital. Many of the streets in the center of town are named after Brazilian states. Jacaraípe was once a fishing village on the mouth of the Jacaraípe River, which is the run-off from Jacaraípe Lake, it has now grown into a large beachfront suburb.

Sports such as beach soccer, beach volleyball, surfing, bodyboard, paragliding, cycling and swimming are popular in the area.
 
 

Jacaraípe has a local artistic community, an Arts' Village called "Vila das Artes", where local artists display their arts. There, a variety of original sculptures made of repurposed materials are exhibited.

References

Geography of Espírito Santo